Matthijs Harings (1593 in Leeuwarden – 1667 in Leeuwarden), was a Dutch Golden Age portrait painter.

According to Houbraken he was a good portrait painter who caught the expressions of his subjects well.
According to the RKD his portraits are sometimes confused with works by Wybrand de Geest.

References

1593 births
1667 deaths
Dutch Golden Age painters
Dutch male painters
People from Leeuwarden